The Story of an African Farm, released in the United States as Bustin' Bonaparte: The Story of an African Farm, is a 2004 South African film directed by David Lister and based on the 1883 novel of the same name by South African author Olive Schreiner.

Plot
The setting is a farm on the slopes of a Karoo Kopje, South Africa, during the 1870s. Fat Tant Sannie (Karin van der Laag) looks after her charges, the sweet Em (Anneke Weidemann) and the independent Lyndall (Kasha Kropinski), with a strict Biblical hand - it was Em's father's dying wish. Gentle Otto (Armin Mueller-Stahl), the farm manager, runs the farm and cares for Waldo, his son. Waldo (Luke Gallant) is bright, and busy building a model of a sheep-shearing machine that he hopes will make them all rich. Things change when the sinister, eccentric Bonaparte Blenkins (Richard E. Grant) with bulbous nose and chimney pot hat arrives. Their childhood is disrupted by the bombastic Irishman who claims blood ties with Wellington and Queen Victoria and so gains uncanny influence over the girls' gross stupid stepmother, Tant Sannie.

As the story of Lyndall, Em and Waldo unfolds to its touching end, we learn not merely of a backwater in colonial history, but of the whole human condition.

Olive Schreiner's intense story of three children living in the African veldt has often been compared to Emily Brontë's Wuthering Heights. Wildly controversial at publication (1883) because of its feminist sentiments, the story has remained a touching and often wickedly funny portrayal of life on a late Victorian farm in South Africa.

Cast
 Armin Mueller-Stahl as Otto
 Richard E. Grant as Bonaparte Blenkins
 Karin van der Laag as Tant Sannie
 Kasha Kropinski as Lyndall
 Luke Gallant .as Waldo
 Anneke Weidemann as Em
 Elriza Swanepoel as Trana
 Nichol Petersen as Tant Sannie's Maid 
 Chris-Jan Steenkamp as Sheep Shearer

References

External links
The official website Retrieved 2011-08-06

2004 films
English-language South African films
Films based on South African novels
2000s English-language films
Films about farmers
Films set on farms
Films directed by David Lister